Oktyabrsky Island is an island in the Pregolya River in Kaliningrad, capital of Kaliningrad Oblast, an exclave of Russia. When Kaliningrad was the German Königsberg, the island was called  and largely used for grazing, except for the district of Lomse at its western end. Since the 2010s the island has been extensively redeveloped around the Kaliningrad Stadium, being constructed for the 2018 FIFA World Cup due to be held in Russia.

River channels

History

A wooden bridge from Löbenicht was built in 1404, and the island was used to store wood. In the mid-15th century, the Germans built an earthen dam and began to dig canals to drain the land, converting it from unused marshes to pastureland. Outside the developed western end of the island, building houses was prohibited as the soil was unstable. In the early 17th century, the government built a second belt of fortifications around Konigsberg, which included the  trench and bastion crossing Lomse from north to south. Three bridges of the famous Seven Bridges of Königsberg mathematical problem connected to Lomse.

References

Islands of Kaliningrad Oblast
Kaliningrad
River islands of Russia